The following highways are numbered 807:

Costa Rica
 National Route 807

United States

Other places